In the mathematical theory of probability and measure, a sub-probability measure is a measure that is closely related to probability measures. While probability measures always assign the value 1 to the underlying set, sub-probability measures assign a value lesser than or equal to 1 to the underlying set.

Definition 

Let  be a measure on the measurable space  .

Then  is called a sub-probability measure if .

Properties 

In measure theory, the following implications hold between measures:

So every probability measure is a sub-probability measure, but the converse is not true. Also every sub-probability measure is a finite measure and a σ-finite measure, but the converse is again not true.

See also

 Helly's selection theorem
 Helly–Bray theorem

References 

Probability theory
Measures (measure theory)